WRR may refer to:

 Water Resources Research, a peer-reviewed scientific journal
 Watford and Rickmansworth Railway (W&RR), a company in England, 1860–1952
 Weighted round robin, a computer network scheduling algorithm
 Wetenschappelijke Raad voor het Regeringsbeleid, the Scientific Council for Government Policy, an advisory board to the Dutch government
 WRR (FM), a classical radio station in Dallas, Texas
 DWRR 101.9, a defunct radio station in the Philippines
 KTCK (AM), a radio station in Dallas, Texas which used the WRR call letters from 1921–1978